Remyella is a genus of mosses belonging to the family Brachytheciaceae.

Species:
 Remyella hawaica Müll.Hal. 
 Remyella ramicola (Broth.) Ignatov & Huttunen
 Remyella vriesei (Dozy & Molk.) Ignatov & Huttunen

References

Hypnales
Moss genera